Ozzy is a 2016 Spanish-Canadian computer-animated comedy film. The film stars Guillermo Romero, José Mota, Fernando Tejero, and Michelle Jenner.

The English dub consists of Jeff Foxworthy, Rob Schneider, Frankie Quinones, and introducing Lexi Walker.

Plot
When the Martins are not allowed to bring their beloved beagle Ozzy with them on vacation to Japan, they drop him off at Blue Creek, which is supposed to be a spa and resort for dogs run by Grunt, the villainous St. Bernard. Little do they know, it’s actually a prison for dogs. A month after they return home from their trip to come pick him up, they’re told that Ozzy passed away as he and his friends Chester the elderly Fox terrier, Fronky the Dachshund and Doc the Old English Sheepdog need to work together to break out and reunite with their families again.

Cast
 Guillermo Romero as Ozzy
 Dani Rovira as Fronki
 José Mota as Vito
 Carlos Areces as Mr. Robbins
 Michelle Jenner as Paula
 Fernardo Tejero as Radar
 Elsa Pataky as Madden
 Pablo Espinosa as Mike
 Selu Nieto as Dominic

English cast
 Jeff Foxworthy as Grunt
 Rob Schneider as Vito
 Frankie Quinones as Radar
 Lexi Walker as Paula
 Jeff Espinoza as Jeff
 Stephen Hughes as Ted, Mr. Robbins, Twin #1, Carlin, Mike
 Robbie K. Jones as Tex, Dominic, Twin 2
 José Luis Martinez as Remy, Afghan Commentator, Additional Voices
 Jonathan D. Mellor as Chester
 Benjamin Nathan-Serio as Ozzy, Eddie, Fronky
 Amanda J. Nolan as Susan
 Kurt Schiller as Bob
 Jimmy Shaw as Decker
 Colleen Terry as Maddie, Reporter
 Garrett Wall as Flash

Additional voices by Jeff Espinoza, Stephen Hughes, Robbie K. Jones, José Luis Martinez, Kurt Schiller, and Garrett Wall

Crew

English dub
 Joseph Wilka - Voice Director

Production
The film was co-produced by Spain's Arcadia Motion Pictures, Capitán Araña, and Pachacamac, and Winnipeg's Tangent Animation. Pre-production was done in Spain, and animation was produced in Canada using Blender software.

Executive producer, Jeff Bell described the movie as a "Pixar-like quality that falls into the prison movie genre with funny tributes to the great prison classics. It's a story about friendship, loyalty, courage and the ability to find the best in ourselves when facing a tough situation".

The film had a budget of 8.5 million dollars.

Release
Disney released the film in Spain on 14 October 2016. The film was released by Signature in the U.K. on 21 October 2016, and Entertainment One in Canada.

References

External links
 
 
 Ozzy at Library and Archives Canada

2016 films
2016 comedy films
2016 computer-animated films
2010s Canadian animated films
2010s children's comedy films
2010s children's animated films
2010s prison films
2010s English-language films
Canadian computer-animated films
Canadian children's comedy films
Canadian prison films
Spanish computer-animated films
Spanish children's films
Prison comedy films
English-language Canadian films
English-language Spanish films
Animated films about dogs
Films about pets
Films set in prison
Films set in 2016
Films scored by Fernando Velázquez
Arcadia Motion Pictures films
2010s Canadian films
2010s Spanish films
Spanish prison films